Angela Rockwood (born March 15, 1975) is an American model and actress, best known for roles in the "Fast and the Furious", the syndicated television series V.I.P. and for her reality Television series Push Girls.

Early life
Born in Clovis, New Mexico, Rockwood is the oldest of four children of German-Thai descent and was raised in the Philippines, Spain, and Guam. At the age of 22, she moved from San Francisco to Los Angeles to finish art school and work with Michelle Bohbot and Bijan. She later turned down a job as a composite sketch artist for the LAPD and instead accepted a modeling job for designer Michelle of Bisou Bisou.

Car crash
On September 3, 2001, Rockwood was involved in a car crash on California's Interstate 5 Highway between San Francisco and Los Angeles during a Labor Day weekend. While they were returning late at night from visiting her maid of honor for her then-upcoming marriage to Dustin Nguyen, the driver (also one of her bridesmaids) lost control of the car. It swerved violently across the road before hitting a rock face and flipping several times before hitting the safety rail and plunging over the bank. Vietnamese American actress Thuy Trang of Mighty Morphin' Power Rangers (who was 27 years old) was killed in the crash after she sustained internal injuries.

Rockwood was thrown from the vehicle before its final impact and was rendered a quadraplegic. Doctors gave her a 3% chance of regaining motor skills and feeling below her neck. Through physical therapy, she regained partial motion in her left index finger two months after the crash. Three months later, she could touch the top of her head. In 2003, she received stem cell treatments in Portugal that allowed her to eventually use a manual wheelchair.

Post-crash career
In 2012, The Sundance Channel announced the creation of Push Girls, a reality television series about living with paralysis in Hollywood produced by Gay Rosenthal, which cast Rockwood among "four dynamic, outspoken and beautiful women" in the Los Angeles area.

Personal life
Rockwood was married to actor Dustin Nguyen on February 14, 2002. They separated and divorced in 2012.

References

External links

1975 births
21st-century American actresses
Actresses from New Mexico
American film actresses
American people of German descent
American people of Thai descent
American people with disabilities
American television actresses
Living people
Participants in American reality television series
People with paraplegia
Actors with disabilities
People from Clovis, New Mexico